Eric Cristóbal Pino Caro (born 15 April 1986) is a Chilean footballer who plays as a midfielder for Deportes Limache in the Segunda División Profesional de Chile.

Career
He joined Brazilian club Boa Esporte on 2 February 2012.

References

External links
 
 

1986 births
Living people
People from Valdivia
Chilean footballers
Chilean expatriate footballers
Universidad de Chile footballers
Cobreloa footballers
C.D. Antofagasta footballers
Rangers de Talca footballers
Boa Esporte Clube players
Deportes La Serena footballers
Deportes Valdivia footballers
Club Deportivo Palestino footballers
Santiago Morning footballers
Deportes Limache footballers
Primera B de Chile players
Chilean Primera División players
Segunda División Profesional de Chile players
Expatriate footballers in Brazil
Chilean expatriate sportspeople in Brazil
Association football midfielders